The Chief of the General Staff of Turkmen Armed Forces is the highest-ranking military officer in the Armed Forces of Turkmenistan, who is responsible for maintaining the operational command of the military and its three major branches. The Chief of the General Staff represents the entire Turkmen military and is in command of the leaders of the Turkmen National Guard, Turkmen Ground Forces, Turkmen Air Force, Turkmen Air Defense Forces, Turkmen Navy and the Turkmen Border Troops.

List of Chiefs

See also
 Armed Forces of Turkmenistan
 Ministry of Defense (Turkmenistan)

References

Military of Turkmenistan
Turkmenistan